Joseph Anthony Sims (born March 1, 1969) is a former professional American football player for five seasons in the National Football League (NFL). After playing college football for the University of Nebraska, Sims was drafted by the Atlanta Falcons in the 11th round (283rd pick overall) of the 1991 NFL Draft. He also played professionally for the Green Bay Packers. During his NFL career, Sims appeared in 53 games and started 20 of those.

References

1969 births
Living people
People from Sudbury, Massachusetts
Sportspeople from Middlesex County, Massachusetts
Players of American football from Massachusetts
American football offensive guards
American football offensive tackles
Nebraska Cornhuskers football players
Atlanta Falcons players
Green Bay Packers players
Lincoln-Sudbury Regional High School alumni